Sabahudin Bujak (born October 20, 1959 in Trebinje, SFR Yugoslavia) is a former Bosnian-Herzegovinian football player and now a football youth coach at NK Čelik Zenica.

Playing career

Club
Bujak started his career in the youth squads of NK Čelik Zenica eventually breaking into the first team. However, faced with little playing chances, he moved to FK Leotar Trebinje where he became a prolific goalscorer in the Yugoslav Second League.

He eventually found his way back to NK Čelik Zenica and was an integral part of their successes in the first few seasons of the independent Bosnia & Herzegovina. During the 1994 season and the final tournament held in Zenica, he was the joint top goalscorer together with Dželaludin Muharemović with 3 goals. The team captain also scored the only goal in the Bosnian Cup final against FK Sloboda Tuzla that brought his team their first double title. The following year he continued with his good form when Čelik celebrated their second double in a row. Although 37 at the time, his 3rd season in Čelik proved to be successful as well when he won the third title in a row. He retired after the first part of the 1997/98 season and joined the coaching team.

Coaching career

Bujak has been a loyal servant to NK Čelik Zenica coaching the senior and youth teams at the club since the second part of the 1997/98 season. He was the assistant manager to Vlatko Glavaš in the second part of the 2011/12 season.

References

1959 births
Living people
People from Trebinje
Association football forwards
Yugoslav footballers
Bosnia and Herzegovina footballers
NK Čelik Zenica players
FK Leotar players
Yugoslav Second League players
Premier League of Bosnia and Herzegovina players